George H. Rawitscher (27 February 1928 – 10 March 2018) was an American physicist who taught at the University of Connecticut.

Rawitscher in his research focused on scattering problems which involve non-local optical models, reaction mechanisms involving break-up and virtual nuclear excitations, the (e,e’p) reaction. He also worked on numerical methods such as Galerkin method and spectral expansions for solving integral equations

Rawitcher was an Elected Fellow of the American Physical Society.

References

1928 births
2018 deaths
Fellows of the American Physical Society
American physicists
University of Connecticut faculty
Stanford University alumni
University of São Paulo alumni